The Norwegian Church Abroad or The Norwegian Seamen’s Church is a religious organisation serving Norwegians and other Scandinavians travelling abroad. Founded in 1864, The Norwegian Seamen’s Mission – Sjømannsmisjonen – was established to secure the moral and religious education of Scandinavian seafarers, but also to give them a "breathing room" where a fellow countryman was available to lend an ear and give some attention. Today, the churches and their staff together with travelling pastors around the globe represent a "resource center" for all Norwegians travelling internationally.

Sjømannskirken annually serves around 700 thousand Norwegians through over 30 churches and 16 mobile services in 30 countries around the world. Several churches operate on a Scandinavian basis. The Norwegian Church Abroad, its main office in Bergen, is a charitable organization supported by the Church of Norway and the Norwegian Government. Sjømannskirken is also a member of the ICMA and the Council of Nordic Seamen's Missions.

For most Norwegians travelling abroad, Sjømannskirken is a nice place to rest: one can read newspapers from home, buy Norwegian food and speak to other Norwegians. Many Norwegians living permanently abroad use the seamen's churches instead of the local ones.

Locations

Africa
Africa, Travelling mission in Africa south of Sahara
Gran Canaria, Spain
Lanzarote, Spain
Tenerife, Spain

Asia
Azerbaijan, Travelling mission
Dubai
East Asia, Travelling mission
Pattaya, Thailand
Phuket, Thailand
Singapore
South Asia, Travelling mission in South and South-East Asia

Europe

Alicante, Spain
Antwerp, Belgium
Aya Napa, Cyprus
Barcelona, Spain Travelling mission from the permanent church in Majorca
Berlin, Germany
Brussels, Belgium
Norwegian Church, Cardiff, United Kingdom
Copenhagen, Denmark
Costa del Sol, Spain Five different locations
Gothenburg, Sweden
Hamburg, Germany
Norwegian Fishermans' Church, Liverpool, United Kingdom
London (St Olav's Church), United Kingdom
Torrenova in Majorca, Spain
Moscow, Russia
Paris, France
Pireus, Greece
Edinburgh, Travelling mission for Scotland, United Kingdom

Stockholm, Sweden
Rotterdam, the Netherlands
Switzerland Ambulant, with office in Genève. 
Torrevieja, Spain

North America

Houston, United States (Norwegian Seamen's Church of Houston (in Norwegian))
Los Angeles, United States (see Norwegian Seamen's Church, San Pedro)
Miami, United States There has been a Norwegian Seamen's church in Miami since the early 1980s. In November 2011, Crown Princess Mette-Marit opened a new building for the church. The church was built as a center for the 10,000 Scandinavians that live in Florida. Around 4,000 of them are Norwegian. The church is also an important place for the 150 Norwegians that work at Disney World. 
Montréal, Quebec, Canada (closed in 1994)
New Orleans, United States
New York City, United States (see The Norwegian Seamen's Church in New York)
San Francisco, United States
Vancouver, British Columbia, Canada
Church services in Washington, D.C., United States

Oceania
Sydney - the base for a travelling mission serving all of Australia and New Zealand

South America
Rio de Janeiro, Brazil

Other
There is also a special travelling mission for workers in the North Sea and one for students in most parts of the world.

Notable former churches

Norwegian Seamen's Church, Leith, Scotland
Norwegian Church, Cardiff, Wales
Norwegian Seamen's Church, Baltimore, Maryland, United States
Norwegian Seamen's Church, Halifax, Nova Scotia, Canada
Norwegian Seamen's Church, Montréal, Québec, Canada
Norwegian Seamen's Church, Pensacola, Florida, United States
Norwegian Church, Swansea, Wales

See also
Harald V of Norway (patron)
Apostleship of the Sea
British & International Sailors’ Society
Danish Seamen's Church and Church Abroad
Church of Sweden Abroad
Finnish Seamen's Mission
International Christian Maritime Association
Scandinavian churches in London
Seamen's Church Institute of Newport
Seamen's Church Institute of New York and New Jersey

References

External links

Sjømannskirken's website 
Overview of Norwegian churches abroad Sjømannskirken  
The Seamen's church's web page in English

Church of Norway
Christian missions to seafarers
Religious organizations established in 1864
1864 establishments in Norway